The 1972 United States Senate election in Oklahoma took place on November 7, 1972. The incumbent Democratic Senator, Fred R. Harris, had retired to run for president. The open seat was won by Republican Dewey F. Bartlett, who defeated Democratic nominee Ed Edmondson. However, his victory underperformed that of President Richard Nixon in the concurrent presidential election, which saw Nixon defeat George McGovern by 49.7% in the state.

Democratic primary

Candidates
Ed Edmondson, U.S. Representative for Oklahoma's 2nd district
Jed Johnson Jr., former U.S. Representative for Oklahoma's 6th district
Clara Luper, Civil Rights activist
Charles R. Nesbitt, Oklahoma Corporation Commissioner
Al Terrill, State Senator for the 32nd district

Results

Republican primary

Candidates
Dewey F. Bartlett, former Governor of Oklahoma

Results

Results

References 

1972
Oklahoma
United States Senate